The 1988 Eastern Michigan Hurons football team represented Eastern Michigan University in the 1988 NCAA Division I-A football season. In their sixth season under head coach Jim Harkema, the Hurons compiled a 6–3–1 record (5–2–1 against conference opponents), finished in second place in the Mid-American Conference, and outscored their opponents, 200 to 173. The team lost to Arizona by a 55-0 score. The team's statistical leaders included Tom Sullivan with 1,664 passing yards, Bob Foster with 762 rushing yards, and Craig Ostrander with 676 receiving yards.

Schedule

References

Eastern Michigan
Eastern Michigan Eagles football seasons
Eastern Michigan Hurons football